Jim Shon is a writer, former school administrator, former state representative, and activist in Hawaii. He served in the state house as a Democrat first elected in 1984. He lost his seat in the 1996 election  to Republican Sam Aiona.

He lived in Syracuse, New York and graduated from Jamesville-DeWitt High School before moving to Hawaii. He served in Korea with the Peace Corps. He has written novels. He is also writes newspaper columns and wrote a book about overseeing the establishment of Hawaii's Charter School system.

Shon led Hawaii's nascent Charter Schools program until he was fired from the post in 2006. He served as director of the Hawaii Education Policy Center.

Writings
Poison in Paradise
The Case of the Good Deed, co-authores with Masa Hagino
The Case of the Rainforest Reunion

Non-fiction
A Charter School Story
Inside Hawaii's Capital

References

Novelists from Hawaii
Year of birth missing (living people)
Living people
American columnists
Activists from Hawaii
Journalists from Hawaii
Democratic Party members of the Hawaii House of Representatives
People from Syracuse, New York
Peace Corps volunteers
American school administrators
Writers from Syracuse, New York
21st-century American journalists
20th-century American journalists
American male journalists
20th-century American novelists
American male novelists
20th-century American male writers
Novelists from New York (state)
21st-century American novelists
Journalists from New York (state)
Educators from Hawaii